Okechukwu Odita (born 12 October 1983) is a Nigerian football player currently with Enugu Rangers.

Career
Odita is a Nigerian star defender and was the heart of Rangers’ defence, before moving to Enyimba International F.C. in 2006.

International
Okey played 1 game for Nigeria national football team in 2004.

External links

1983 births
Living people
Nigerian footballers
Association football defenders
Enyimba F.C. players
Rangers International F.C. players
Nigeria Professional Football League players
Nigeria international footballers
Sportspeople from Warri